Mohamed El Gawarhy, (born January 26, 1996 in Cairo) is a professional squash player who represented Egypt. He reached seventh place at the World Junior Championship in Poland at 2013, fifth place at the world Junior Championship in Namibia at 2014, and first place at the World Junior Teams Championship in Namibia at 2014. He also reached a career-high world ranking of World No. 108 in July 2015.

References

External links 
 
 

1996 births
Living people
Egyptian male squash players
21st-century Egyptian people